In Fijian mythology, Nabagatai is a village on the road to Bulu, where the souls of the dead live (Williams and Calvert 1858:245).

See also
Bulu (Fijian mythology)
Burotu

References
T. Williams, J. Calvert, Fiji and the Fijians, Heylin, 1858.

Fijian mythology
Underworld